Emily Shanks, also known as Emiliya Yakovlevna Shanks (1 August 1857, in Moscow – 13 January 1936, in London), was a British painter living in Moscow.  She was the first woman to be elected to the Russian Society for Travelling Art Exhibitions or Peredvizhniki.

Early life
Emily Shanks was born in Moscow, the second daughter of James Steuart Shanks and Mary Louisa Schilling.  James arrived in Moscow in 1852 where he went into partnership with Swede Henrik Conrad Bolin to found Shanks & Bolin, Magasin Anglais (The English Shop).  The shop was financially successful and the Shanks family led a comfortable life allowing the daughters the time and means to engage with the Moscow intelligentsia.

Emily's older sister Louise Shanks married Aylmer Maude and translated Tolstoy's novels into English; these translations were published by the Oxford University Press and were considered the best translations of their day. Emily's younger sister Mary was a friend of Tolstoy's eldest daughter Tatyana; the visitor book records that both Emily and Mary were visitors to the Tolstoy family home.

Emily commenced her studies at the Moscow School of Painting, Sculpture and Architecture around 1882 where she was instructed by prominent members of the Peredvizhniki: Vasily Polenov, Vladimir Makovsky and Illarion Pryanishnikov. In 1890 she was awarded a "large silver medal" by the Moscow School of Painting, Sculpture and Architecture for her painting Reading a letter. She graduated that year with the rank of 'artist'.

The Peredvizhniki and the Polenov circle
Shanks formed a friendship with the Russian painter and designer Yelena Polenova and her brother Vasily Polenov.  Emily and her sister Mary would regularly paint together with the Polenovs, this is particularly well documented in the Polenov letters from the winter of 1891–1892.
In 1891 Emily’s painting Older Brother (Старший брат) was accepted by the Peredvizhniki for exhibition. On 7 March 1891 Vasily Polenov wrote to his wife Natalia Polenov that this painting had caught the attention of the Tsarina Alexandra Feodorovna who expressed interest.

In 1892 Shanks's painting New Girl at School was accepted by the Peredvizhniki for exhibition. The painting was lauded by Ilya Repin and subsequently sold to Pavel Tretyakov and is still owned by the Tretyakov Gallery.
In 1894 Shanks was elected to membership of the Peredvizhniki for her the painting Inkspot.  She became the first woman to be elected as a full member of the Peredvizhniki.

From 1891 to 1915 Shanks exhibited with the Peredvizhniki at 19 of their exhibitions. Shanks also exhibited with The Moscow Union of Artists and the Moscow Society for Lovers of the Arts and the Moscow Lemercier Gallery

Exile from Russia
At the outbreak of the Great War Emily and most of the Shanks family moved back to London. The family business and home were lost during the Russian Revolution.  In 1916 and 1918 she exhibited her work at the summer exhibition at Royal Academy of Arts.  She showed two paintings:  1916 A bit of Moscow and 1918  Peaceful Moscow.
Shanks died on 13 January 1936, aged 78 years, at Holland Road, Kensington.

Paintings

Other paintings:

The Lesson (1887), privately owned
Older brother, exhibited with the Peredvizhniki in 1891, location unknown
The Challenge, location unknown
Inkspot, exhibited with the Peredvizhniki in 1894, location unknown
My Favourite Doll, unknown owner and unknown date
 Work in the Syzransky Museum, Samara
Double Portrait of Aylmer Maude and Stella Meldrum, privately owned
A Bit of Moscow, exhibited Royal Academy 1916
Peaceful Moscow exhibited Royal Academy 1918
Portrait of Aylmer Maude, privately owned
Portrait of Nial McLeland, around 1895, privately owned
Portrait of Natalia Vasilievna Polenova (1858 – 1931), wife of Vasily Polenov, 1894, Polenovo museum
Tsarina's Golden Chamber, depicts the Tsarina's Golden Chamber, privately owned

Notes
 Shanks' Russian name Yakovlevna or Jakovlevna is a patronymic from her father's name, James.

References

Further reading

 Harvey Pitcher (1984), "The Smiths of Moscow: a story of Britons abroad", Swallow House Books
 Harvey Pitcher (1994), "Muir and Mirrielees: The Scottish Partnership That Became a Household Name in Russia", Swallow House Books
 Donnelly, Michael E. (2009), "The Immortal Itinerants (Peredvizhniki)", Russian Paintings Gallery.
 Anna Horsbrugh-Porter (1993), "Memories of Revolution: Russian Women Remember", Routledge
 Russian Art Union website
 Christian, R F (1978) Tolstoy’s letters II 1880-1910
 Sakharova, E V, (1964) Vasiliĭ Dmitrievich Polenov, Elena Dmitrievna Polenova, letters.
 Sakharova, E V, (1950) Vasiliĭ Dmitrievich Polenov, letters.
 Harkness, Kristen M. (2009) ELENA POLENOVA, MARIIA IAKUNCHIKOVA. AND THE EMERGENCE OF MODERN ART IN RUSSIA, Purdue University
 Shanks, Donald, (1986): Shanks Family History. Available in the Leeds Russian archive, Shanks Family papers.
 Jarman, Angela (1975) Royal Academy exhibitors, 1905-1970 : a dictionary of artists and their work in the Summer Exhibitions of the Royal Academy of Arts, Hilmarton Manor Press
 Iovleva, Lidiya Ivanovna (1975) Notes on Emily Shanks, Tretyakov Gallery.  Available in the Leeds Russian archive, Shanks Family papers.

External links

 Yulia Tulinova, Emily and Mary Shanks. Russian-Born Englishwomen Among the Peredvizhniki in Tretyakov Gallery Magazine  #3 2022 (76), Special edition
 Shanks Family History
 W A Bolin
 Harkness, Kristen M. (1991) ELENA POLENOVA, MARIIA IAKUNCHIKOVA. AND THE EMERGENCE OF MODERN ART IN RUSSIA

1857 births
1936 deaths
Artists from Moscow
Russian women painters
19th-century painters from the Russian Empire
20th-century Russian painters
19th-century British painters
20th-century British painters
Peredvizhniki
19th-century British women artists
20th-century British women artists
19th-century women artists from the Russian Empire
20th-century Russian women artists
Moscow School of Painting, Sculpture and Architecture alumni